Atletico Partick is a Scottish sitcom that aired on BBC from 1995 to 1996. It was written by Ian Pattison and produced and directed by Colin Gilbert who worked together on Rab C. Nesbitt.

Cast
Gordon Kennedy as Jack Roan
Aline Mowat as Karen Roan
Tom McGovern as Ally
Steven McNicoll as Lachie
Iain McColl as Pettigrew
Clive Russell as Bonner (series)
Anne Marie Timoney as Marie (series)
Ronnie Letham as Gazza (series)
Jonathan Watson as Sean (series)
Gavin Mitchell as Stick (series)

Plot
The main character was Jack Roan, who is more passionate about football than he is about his wife, Karen. She finds some solace with Ally, who is more interested in having sex than in playing football. Jack's best friend is Pettigrew, whose wife is into witchcraft. The football team they play for, Atletico Partick, are in a Sunday amateur league.

Episodes

Pilot (1995)

Series 1 (1996)

References
Mark Lewisohn, "Radio Times Guide to TV Comedy", BBC Worldwide Ltd, 2003
Atletico Partick at British TV Comedy

External links 
 

1995 Scottish television series debuts
1996 Scottish television series endings
1990s British sitcoms
BBC television sitcoms
Television shows set in Glasgow
Scottish television sitcoms
BBC Scotland television shows
English-language television shows
1995 in Scotland
1996 in Scotland
1990s Scottish television series